The 1903 Navy Midshipmen football team represented the United States Naval Academy during the 1903 college football season. In their first and only season under head coach Burr Chamberlain, the Midshipmen compiled a 4–7–1 record, shut out four opponents (including a scoreless tie with Baltimore Medical College), and were outscored by all opponents by a combined score of 130 to 77.

Schedule

References

Navy
Navy Midshipmen football seasons
Navy Midshipmen football